Zápy is a market town in Prague-East District in the Central Bohemian Region of the Czech Republic. It has about 900 inhabitants.

Geography
It lies in the Central Elbe Table, in a flat agricultural landscape of the Polabí region. The Elbe River briefly forms the northern municipal border.

History
The first written mention of Zápy is from 1052. It was first referred to as a market town in 1543. From 1964 to 1990, it was an administrative part of Brandýs nad Labem-Stará Boleslav. Since 1990, it has been a separate municipality.

Transport
The D10 motorway from Prague to Turnov runs through the municipality.

Sport
Zápy is home to a football club SK Zápy, which plays in the Bohemian Football League (third tier of the Czech football system). Zápy is the least populated Czech municipality with a football club on such as level.

Sight
A cultural monument is the ruin of the former Gothic fortress. Only the cellars, the torso of the palace and a fragment of the tower have survived to this day.

References

External links

Populated places in Prague-East District
Market towns in the Czech Republic